Sylvia Convey (born 1948) is a Latvian Australian self-taught artist known for her paintings, quilts and dolls.

Life
Sylvia Convey was born in a refugee camp at Itzehoe near Hamburg, Germany in 1948. With her parents and elder sister she sailed to Australia on the Skaugum in early 1950. They were part of the first wave of immigrants to arrive in Australia after World War II, joining a large group of displaced Latvians that settled in Australia in the late 40s and early 50s.

Work
As an outsider artist, her images are derived from her own day-to-day and oneiric experiences. She includes references to her ancestral heritage. Eroticism is also a dominant theme in her oeuvre.

A recurring thread in her work has been the blurring of boundaries between art forms. As a painter she rejected the primacy of canvas and used non-conventional surfaces. As a printmaker she has used textiles as much as paper and her sculptural muse finds expression in wonderfully exotic and exuberant cloth dolls. She approached quilt making in a spontaneous rather than formal manner as it gave her lifelong love of fabric and colour complete expression. She loves the sensual, tactile pleasure of handling cloth — tearing, cutting, printing and painting it to produce shimmering life embracing forms.

Collections and exhibits
Convey's work has been acquired by several institutions including the National Gallery of Australia, Iwalewa Haus at the University of Bayreuth and the Canberra Museum and Gallery.

Since 1972, she has exhibited in Australia, Germany, the United States, and France. Her work was part of the landmark exhibition Australian outsiders at the Halle St. Pierre in Paris in 2006.
Convey's work was included in the 2010 exhibition 13 Australian Outsider Artists at Callan Park Gallery. In 2015, a survey exhibition of Sylvia Convey and her husband's work titled Double Vision was held at the Orange Regional Gallery.

References

 Australian Migrant ships 1946-1977, Peter Plowman (Chiswick)
 Allgemeines Kunstlerlexikon Volume 21 (K.G. Saur Verlag) Munich 1999
 Outsider Art in Australia - Ulli Beier, Phillip Hammal (EDS) (Aspect) 1989
 Australian Naive Art - Sandra Warner (Craftsman House) 1997
 Australian Printmaking in the 1990s - Sasha Grishin (Craftsman House) 1997
 Australian Outsiders - Martine Lusardy (Halle St. Pierre) 2006

External links
Sylvia Convey artwork

1948 births
Living people
People from Itzehoe
20th-century Australian women artists
20th-century Australian artists
21st-century Australian women artists
21st-century Australian artists
Outsider artists
Women outsider artists